José M. Escalona (born January 7, 1986) is a Venezuelan professional baseball pitcher for the Parmaclima Parma of the Italian Baseball League.

In addition, Escalona played for the  Italy national baseball team at the 2017 World Baseball Classic.

Personal
Escalona's grandfather is Italian, enabling him to become a naturalized Italian citizen.

References

External links

1986 births
Living people
Águilas del Zulia players
Baseball pitchers
Caffe Danesi Nettuno players
Cardenales de Lara players
High Desert Mavericks players
Italian baseball players
Citizens of Italy through descent
People from Lara (state)
Rimini Baseball Club players
Parma Baseball Club players
Tiburones de La Guaira players
Venezuelan expatriate baseball players in the United States
Venezuelan people of Italian descent
Venezuelan Summer League Aguirre players
Venezuelan Summer League Mariners players
Wisconsin Timber Rattlers players
2016 European Baseball Championship players
2017 World Baseball Classic players